Canada women's national floorball team is the national team of Canada.  At the 2007 Floorball Women's World Championship in Frederikshavn, Denmark, the team finished seventh in the B-Division. At the 2013 Floorball Women's World Championship in Brno and Ostrava, Czech Republic, the team finished thirteenth.

References 

Women's national floorball teams
Floorball